Meldon D'Silva (born 17 November 1994) is an Indian professional footballer who plays as a defender for Churchill Brothers in the I-League.

Career
Born in Benaulim, Goa, D'Silva began his career with Dempo and Salgaocar's youth teams before playing in the Goa Professional League with Wilfried Leisure. In October 2014, he signed with professional I-League side Mumbai. He stayed with the club for two seasons before returning to Goa to play with Calangute Association. After showing good displays in the Goa Professional League with Calangute, D'Silva signed on loan with his former club Dempo.

After the Goan football season finished, D'Silva signed with Churchill Brothers for the I-League. He made his professional debut for the club on 10 February 2017 against Aizawl. He started and played the full match but could not prevent the club from losing 3–1.

International
In 2014, D'Silva represented the Goan–India team during the Lusophony Games. He scored the opening goal for Goa–India in the gold medal match against Mozambique as the Goan side won 3–2.

Career statistics

Club

Honour

Goa lusophony 
2014 Lusophony Games (1)

References

1994 births
Living people
People from Benaulim
Indian footballers
Dempo SC players
Salgaocar FC players
Mumbai FC players
Churchill Brothers FC Goa players
Association football defenders
Footballers from Goa
Goa Professional League players
I-League players